Sivaranjani is 1978 Telugu drama film written and directed by Dasari Narayana Rao. The film is about a village girl Sivaranjani who goes on to become a famous film actress, played by Jaya Sudha. Later it was remade in Tamil as Natchathiram with Sripriya in the leading role in 1980.

It is a musical film with lyrics penned by Veturi Sundararama Murthy and Dasam Gopalakrishna . The music score is provided by P. Ramesh Naidu.

Plot

The film is about a village girl Sivaranjani (Jayasudha), who goes on to become a famous film actress. A small town man, Hari Prasad forms her fan club and starts admiring her. Sivaranjani starts finding her true love in this man. She gives up her career as a film actress, escapes the trauma of limelight and wants to settle down with this man. However, Nirmallamma and Subhashini approach Jayasudha to convince her not to marry the boy. Sivaranjani sacrifices her life so that the boy and Subhashini can marry.

Cast
 Jayasudha... Sivaranjani
 Hari Prasad... Sivaranjani's Fan
 Mohan Babu
 Allu Ramalingaiah
 Nirmalamma
 Subhashini
 Gokina Rama Rao... Sivaranjani's Brother
 K. V. Chalam	
 Murali Mohan
Savitri... Guest appearance as herself

Soundtrack
Music by Pasupuleti Ramesh Naidu. The lead violin tune of "Joru Meedunnave Tummeda Nee Joru Evari Kosame Tummeda?" was played by Y. N. Sharma, father of music director Mani Sharma.

 "Abhinava Thaaravo Naa Abhimana Thaaravo" (Lyrics: C. Narayana Reddy; Singer: S. P. Balasubrahmanyam)
 "Chandamama Vacchaadamma Tongi Tongi Ninu Choochaa – P. Susheela"
 "Joru Meedunnave Thummeda, Nee Joru Evari Kosame Thummeda – P. Susheela"
 "Maapalle Vadalaku Krishnamurthi Nuvvu Konte Panulakochava" (Lyrics : Dasam Gopala Krishna)
 "Mee Ammavaadu Naa Kosam Eeniuntadu"
 "Navami Naati Vennela Nenu Dasami Naati Jaabili Neevu" (Singers: S. P. Balasubrahmanyam and P. Susheela)
 "Paalakollu Santalona Paapayammo Paapayamma" (Singers: S. P. Balasubrahmanyam and P. Susheela)

References

External links
 Sivaranjani film at IMDb.

1978 films
1970s Telugu-language films
Films directed by Dasari Narayana Rao
Films scored by Ramesh Naidu
Telugu films remade in other languages
Films about filmmaking